Joe Daniels may refer to:

People
Joe Daniels (drummer) (born 1970), rock drummer
Joe Daniels (jazz drummer) (1908–1993), jazz musician from South Africa
Josephus Daniels (1862–1948), U.S. Secretary of the Navy

Other
Joe Daniels (horse), a Thoroughbred racehorse who the 1872 Belmont Stakes

See also
Joseph J. Daniel, North Carolina jurist

Daniels, Joe